, Chinese characters meaning "south mountain(s)", is romanized in different ways according to language. It may refer to:

 Nanshan (disambiguation) (pinyin: Nánshān) for Chinese places
 Nanzan (disambiguation) for Japanese places
 Namsan (disambiguation) for Korean places

See also
 South Mountain (disambiguation)
 山南 (disambiguation)
 Nam Shan (disambiguation)